Harper Phillips (born May 4, 1973 in Burlington, Vermont) is a former American alpine skier who competed in the men's giant slalom at the 1994 Winter Olympics.

External links
 sports-reference.com
 

1973 births
Living people
American male alpine skiers
Olympic alpine skiers of the United States
Alpine skiers at the 1994 Winter Olympics
Sportspeople from Burlington, Vermont
20th-century American people